Leyenda del puente inca (English language: Legend of the Inca Bridge) is a 1923 silent Argentine film directed and written by José A. Ferreyra. The film premiered in November 1923 in Buenos Aires.

Cast
Nelo Cosimi as Incano
Amelia Mirel as María Rosa
Yolanda Labardén as Mavelina
Héctor Míguez as Raimundo

External links
 

1923 films
1920s Spanish-language films
Argentine black-and-white films
Argentine silent films
Films directed by José A. Ferreyra